Amatasi are a type of Samoan double-hulled watercraft. Its sails were woven pandanus leaves tied to 2 spars. The hull was sometimes built of planks.

See also
List of multihulls
va'a
va'a-tele

References

External links
Amatasi Image at Hawaii State Foundation on Culture and the Arts
Modern day model by Francis Pimmel

Watercraft